Ogloblin (masculine) or Ogloblina (feminine) is a Russian last name shared by the following people:

 Dmitry Ogloblin (born 1956), a former Soviet speedskater
  (1893—1942), a Russian entomologist
 Yulia Ogloblina (born 1989), Russian politician